David Woods was an American lawyer and politician who was Speaker of the New York State Assembly for two terms.

Biography
Woods lived in Salem, New York. He was Sheriff of Washington County from 1806 to 1810.

He was a Democratic-Republican member of the New York State Assembly from Washington County in 1811, and from Washington and Warren Counties in 1816–17. Then he removed to Madison and practiced law there. He was again a member of the Assembly in 1818, this time from Madison County. He was Speaker in 1816–17 and 1818.

In 1821, he lost the election for Congress to Thomas H. Hubbard. From 1825 to 1831, he was a Canal Appraiser. In 1826, he was again a member of the Assembly from Washington County. Afterwards he was a judge of the Washington County Court.

His daughter Pamela was the wife of Samuel Nelson, who served as an Associate Justice of the Supreme Court of the United States

References

Further reading
History of Madison County, New York by Luna M. Hammond Whitney (1872)

Speakers of the New York State Assembly
People from Salem, New York
New York (state) state court judges
People from Madison, New York
Year of death missing
Year of birth missing